Kuopio Steelers (formerly known as Varkaus Steelers) are an American football team  originally from Varkaus, Finland in years 1991-2005, and since 2006 from Kuopio, Finland. The team plays in the Finnish Maple League and it has also played in the European Football League. The club's home field is Väinölänniemi Stadium in the Väinölänniemi district.

The Steelers play in the Men’s Maple League as well as various junior leagues in B- (under 19), C- (under 17), D- (under 15) and E-juniors (under 13). In the summer of 2013, the Steelers formed the women’s American football team that participated in the women’s Division I in the 2014 season. In the 2018 season, the team won their own block in Division I and promoted to the Women’s Maple League. The Steelers has won three Finnish championships in 2020, 2021 and 2022.

Team Roster (2019)

Staff 
  Pekka Utriainen (head coach)
  Ari Hartikainen (assistant coach)
  Sami Hovinen (assistant coach)
  Marco Lindroos (assistant coach)
  Petri Pellinen (assistant coach)
  Erkka Vehkomäki (assistant coach)

QB 
  # Seth Peters

RB & FB 
  # Gerard Johnson
  # Ville Lindsten
  # Perttu Pajunen
  # Samppa Sinkkonen

WR  
  # Johannes Jauhiainen
  # Kaapro Keränen
  # Waltteri Kinnunen
  # Tino Ndongo
  # Jaakko Paananen
  # Ville Simola
  # Petteri Vilpponen
  # Juho Väisänen

OL 
  # Tapio Jääskeläinen
  # Roope Korhonen
  # Oskari Laitinen
  # Niilo Ojansivu
  # Simo Ovaskainen
  # Jupe Peltonen
  # Eppu Pulkkinen
  # Mikael Vilhunen

DL 
  # Matias Kauppinen
  # Perttu Kosonen
  # Jani Lindqvist
  # Victor Miller-Gonzalez
  # Aapo Peräkorpi
  # Artur Pinheiro
  # Leevi Ruotsalainen

LB 
  # Mattias Eriksson
  # Donavan Hayden
  # Teemu Hirvelä
  # Toni Tuppurainen
  # Kusti Ukkonen
  # Aku Uotila

CB/S 
  # Iisakki Eskelinen
  # Toni Hartikainen
  # Santeri Inkinen
  # Thomas Kaczocha
  # Markus Ojainväli
  # Leevi Ojala
  # Iiro Pekkarinen
  # Tiivo Savolainen

See also
 Helsinki Roosters
 Seinäjoki Crocodiles
 Tampere Saints

References

External links
 Kuopio Steelers
 Team at Vaahteraliiga
 Team Facebook Page
 Team Instagram Page

American football teams in Finland
Kuopio
1991 establishments in Finland
American football teams established in 1991